Nastasja is a Polish/Japanese film released in 1994, directed by Andrzej Wajda.

The film is an adaptation on the last chapter of Fyodor Dostoyevski's novel The Idiot, in which Prince Mishkin and Rogozin return to the past in a conversation over the dead body of Nastasja. Both Prince Mishkin and Nastasja in flashbacks are played by the same person, onnagata actor Bandō Tamasaburō V.

Wajda produced and directed Nastassya Filipovna, a stage play version of the piece, at the Stary Teatr in Kraków in 1977.

External links

Films directed by Andrzej Wajda
1990s Polish-language films
1994 films
1994 drama films
Films based on The Idiot
Films adapted into plays
1990s multilingual films
Polish multilingual films